Bryaninops amplus, known commonly as the large whip goby  or white-line seawhip goby, is a species of marine fish in the family Gobiidae.

The white-line seawhip goby is widespread throughout the tropical waters of the Indo-Pacific area, including Hawaii but not the Red Sea.

This fish is a small size that can reach a maximum size of 4.6 cm length.

References

External links

 

amplus
Fish described in 1985
Taxa named by Helen K. Larson